Rectojapyx is a genus of diplurans in the family Japygidae.

Species
 Rectojapyx herzegovinensis (Verhoeff, 1923)

References

Diplura